Chaas (gu:છાશ chhash, hi:छाछ chhachh) is a curd-based drink popular across the Indian subcontinent. In Rajasthani it is called ghol, in Odia it is called Ghol/Chaash, moru in Tamil and Malayalam, taak in Marathi, majjiga in Telugu, majjige in Kannada, ale (pronounced a-lay) in Tulu and ghol in Bengali. In Indian English, it is often referred to as buttermilk.

Etymology 
The name Chaas or Chaach is derived from Sanskrit word Chacchika (छच्छिका), meaning churned yogurt from which butter has been removed.

Preparation and variations
Chaas is made by churning yogurt (curds/dahi) and cold water together in a pot, using a hand-held instrument called madhani (whipper). This can be consumed plain or seasoned with a variety of spices or made sweet (and then known as Meethi Chaas). Chaas can be made from fresh yogurt, and the natural flavour of such chaas is mildly sweet.

Seasoning and flavours
Chaas can be consumed plain, but a little salt is usually added. This is the most common seasoning for chaas. Numerous other seasonings and spices can be added to salted chaas, either singly or in combination with each other. These spices are usually roasted in a wok, using a spoonful of cooking oil, before being added to the Chaas. The spices which can be added thus are: Coarsely ground and roasted cumin seeds, curry leaves, asafoetida, grated ginger, very finely diced green chillies and Mustard seeds. Sugar can also be added to chaas, but if sugar is added, then neither salt nor spice is usually used. 

Vendors have come up with several proprietary products and standardized flavours of chaas which are produced on an industrial scale and sold as bottled drinks. The best-seller among such brands is Amul's Masala Chaas, which has standardized several traditional flavours for the mass bottled-drink market. Other popular modern flavours available as bottled drinks include rose-flavoured Chaas Gulabi and mint-flavoured Mint Chaas.

Consumption
In the rural areas of India, the consumption of chaas has cultural resonances and associations which are not found in the context of other beverages like tea, coffee or lassi. An earthen pot is used to prepare chaas and store it for a few hours before consumption. The use of an earthen pot makes the chaas cool even in summer. In the extremely hot desert areas of Gujarat and Rajasthan, people consume chaas with salt after getting exposed to the sun because this may aid rehydration. Chaas or Moru is consumed more in Southern India as it rehydrates the body from the hot climate. Chaas is consumed all year round. It is usually taken immediately after meals, but is also consumed on its own as a beverage.

People also consume chaas for its health benefits. The condiments in chaas, especially pepper and ginger, help reduce the burning sensation felt with acidity. Those spices also help improve digestion. Chaas is also packed with electrolytes and water, helping the body recover from dehydration.

See also

 List of fermented foods
 List of Indian beverages
 Mattha
 Borhani, a similar Bangladeshi drink
 Ayran, a similar Turkish drink

References

External links 
 Chass recipe by Tarla Dalal

Fermented dairy products
Non-alcoholic drinks
Indian drinks
Yogurt-based drinks
Indian dairy products